Julen Colinas Olaizola (born 16 April 1988) is a Spanish professional footballer who plays for Villarrubia CF as a winger.

Club career
Born in San Sebastián, Gipuzkoa, Basque Country, Colinas was a Real Sociedad youth graduate. On 25 February 2007 he made his senior debut with the reserves, coming on as a second-half substitute for Borja Viguera in a 0–0 away draw against Cultural y Deportiva Leonesa in the Segunda División B.

After loan stints at Tercera División sides CD Lagun Onak and SD Beasain, Colinas started to feature more regularly for the B-side. On 28 June 2012, he moved to fellow third-tier club Real Unión on a one-year loan deal.

Colinas continued to appear in the third division in the following campaigns, representing CD Toledo, Lleida Esportiu and Cultural y Deportiva Leonesa; with the latter he achieved promotion to Segunda División as champions, contributing with eleven goals in 39 matches (play-offs included).

Colinas made his professional debut on 18 August 2017, replacing Iker Guarrotxena in a 0–2 away loss against Lorca FC. The following 12 January, he moved to UCAM Murcia CF after cutting ties with Cultu. On August, 2019, he was signed by Mohun Bagan to play in the I-League on a one-year deal. On December 20, 2019, he left the club due to a ligament injury and he cannot play the remaining i league matches.

Honours
Cultural Leonesa
Segunda División B: 2016–17

References

External links

1988 births
Living people
Spanish footballers
Footballers from San Sebastián
Association football wingers
Segunda División players
Segunda División B players
Tercera División players
Real Unión footballers
CD Toledo players
Lleida Esportiu footballers
Cultural Leonesa footballers
UCAM Murcia CF players
SD Beasain footballers